Bishop and Clerks Light is a lighthouse located in open water on Bishop and Clerks Rocks, about two nautical miles south of Point Gammon in Hyannis, Massachusetts.

The light was established in a granite tower in 1858.  It was automated in 1923, deactivated five years later and demolished  in 1952. It was replaced with a white 30-foot pyramidal day beacon.  The day beacon was replaced with a round, orange and white 30-foot tower placed on top of the original Bishop & Clerk's granite base in 1998.

References

External links

Information on the lighthouse

Lighthouses completed in 1858
Lighthouses completed in 1998
Lighthouses in Barnstable County, Massachusetts